Mohammed Zia Salehi is the chief of administration for the National Security Council in Afghanistan.

A New York Times article in 2010, citing "officials in Kabul and Washington," reported that Salehi was on the payroll of the Central Intelligence Agency. The article stated that it is not clear what Salehi did for the CIA.

In July, Salehi was arrested by Afghan police after he was wiretapped soliciting a car for his son as a bribe, in exchange for impeding an American-backed investigation into a company suspected of smuggling dollars out of the country. He was released seven hours later after Hamid Karzai intervened on his behalf.

References

Afghan politicians
Living people
Year of birth missing (living people)